Marieluise-Fleißer-Preis is a German biennial literary prize, given by the town of Ingolstadt, Bavaria, on behalf of the Marieluise-Fleißer-Gesellschaft, in memory of the writer Marieluise Fleißer who was born in Ingolstadt. It is awarded to a German-language author who writes, as Fleißer did, about the conflict of unfulfilled claims to happiness and everyday life ("Konflikt zwischen unerfüllten Glücksansprüchen und dem alltäglichen Leben". The prize money is €10,000.

Recipients 

 1981 Irmgard Keun
 1986 
 1989 Herta Müller
 1992 Thomas Hürlimann
 1995 Robert Schneider
 1998 
 2001 Petra Morsbach
 2003 
 2005 
 2007 Franz Xaver Kroetz
 2009 Dea Loher
 2011 Sibylle Lewitscharoff
 2013 Rainald Goetz
 2015 Ulrich Peltzer
 2017 Christoph Ransmayr
 2019 
 2021

References

External links 
 Prize on the pages of the Marieluise-Fleißer-Gesellschaft

German literary awards